The Electric Vehicle Association of Great Britain (EVA) was an organisation of the manufacturers of electric vehicles and associated equipment, batteries etc. founded in 1938.

References

Trade associations based in the United Kingdom
Electric vehicle industry
1938 establishments in the United Kingdom